The Ng Tung River (Hong Kong Hakka: Ng2tung2 Ho2), also known as the River Indus, is a river in the northeast New Territories, Hong Kong. Tributaries of the river include the Tan Shan River (River Jhelum) and Kwan Tei River. It collects other major rivers like the Shek Sheung River (River Sutlej) and Sheung Yue River (River Beas) in Sheung Shui, and finally empties into the Sham Chun River (Shenzhen River).

See also
 List of rivers and nullahs in Hong Kong

External links 

 Rivers of Hong Kong, in Chinese

Rivers of Hong Kong
Sheung Shui